Utaetus is an extinct genus of mammal in the order Cingulata, related to the modern armadillos. The genus contains a single species, Utaetus buccatus. It lived in the Late Paleocene to Late Eocene (about 60 to 36 million years ago) and its fossil remains were found in Argentina and Brazil in South America.

Description 
In particular, the appearance likely recalled that of the modern Euphractus, and it already had the typical well-developed xenarthral joints on the vertebrae. Among the other characteristics in common with the modern armadillos, Utaetus possessed a bony connection between the ischium and the sacrum (this structure was constituted by caudal vertebrae known as pseudosacral) and continuous-growth cylindrical teeth similar to chisels, with wear in the occlusal part. There were ten lower teeth on each side of the jaw; the first two were much smaller and are interpreted as incisors. Unlike later armadillos, however, Utaetus still had a varying amount of enamel on the lingual and buccal surfaces of the teeth, and the cervical vertebrae were separated (and not co-ossified). The skeleton shows that this animal was suitable for digging, as evidenced by the presence of a large acromion on the scapula and a prominent olecranon on the ulna. The posterior margin of the scapula was thickened, and formed a secondary incipient spine.

Classification 
The genus Utaetus was first described in 1902 by Florentino Ameghino, based on fossil remains initially thought to date back to the Cretaceous. The type species is Utaetus buccatus, also known for cranial material, but Ameghino described further species based on fragmentary remains (U. deustus, U. lenis, U. laevus, U. laxus), now considered nomina dubia. Utaetus is considered a primitive member of the Dasipodidae, the family that includes the modern armadillos and their extinct relatives. In particular, Utaetus and its close relatives (such as Parutaetus) could be closely related to the modern genus Euphractus. The name Utaetus is an anagram of Eutatus, another extinct armadillo.

Distribution 
Fossils of Utaetus have been found in:
 Argentina
 Geste Formation (Divisaderan)
 Quebrada de los Colorados Formation (Barrancan)
 Sarmiento Formation (Barrancan)
 Brazil
 Guabirotuba Formation (Divisaderan)

References

Bibliography

Further reading 
 F. Ameghino. 1902. Notices préliminaires sur des mammifères nouveaux des terrains Crétacé de Patagonie {preliminary notes on new mammals from the Cretaceous terrains of Patagonia]. Boletin de la Academia Nacional de Ciencias de Córdoba 17:5-70
 G. G. Simpson. 1948. The beginning of the age of mammals in South America. Part I. Bulletin of the American Museum of Natural History 91:1-232
 A. A. Carlini, M. R. Ciancio, and G. J. Scillato-Yanè. 2010. Middle Eocene - Early Miocene Dasypodidae (Xenarthra) of southern South America: biostratigraphy and palaeoecology. In R. H. Madden, A. A. Carlini, M. G. Vucetich, R. F. Kay (eds.), The Paleontology of Gran Barranca: Evolution and Environmental Change through the Middle Cenozoic of Patagonia 106-129

Prehistoric cingulates
Priabonian life
Eocene mammals of South America
Divisaderan
Paleogene Argentina
Fossils of Argentina
Paleogene Brazil
Fossils of Brazil
Fossil taxa described in 1902
Taxa named by Florentino Ameghino
Golfo San Jorge Basin
Sarmiento Formation